Lingga Lie (born 18 July 1987) is a retired male badminton player from Indonesia. Lingga Lie was a runner-up at the New Zealand Open 2008 and third in the Indonesia National Sports Week XVII. In the same year, he won the Smiling Fish and Singapore Asian Satelitte tournament. In 2004 he had become Indonesian junior champion in mixed doubles with Yulianti.

Achievements

BWF Grand Prix 
The BWF Grand Prix has two level such as Grand Prix and Grand Prix Gold. It is a series of badminton tournaments, sanctioned by Badminton World Federation (BWF) since 2007.

Men's doubles

 BWF Grand Prix Gold tournament
 BWF Grand Prix tournament

BWF International Challenge/Series 
Men's doubles

Mixed doubles

 BWF International Challenge tournament
 BWF International Series tournament

References 

1986 births
Living people
Indonesian male badminton players
Indonesian people of Chinese descent
People from Bogor
Sportspeople from West Java
21st-century Indonesian people